Maurice Tempelsman (born August 26, 1929) is a Belgian-American businessman and diamond merchant. He was the longtime companion of Jacqueline Kennedy Onassis, former First Lady of the United States.

Early life 
Tempelsman was born on August 26, 1929, in Antwerp, Belgium, the son of Leon and Helene Tempelsman, both Orthodox Jews, in a Yiddish-speaking family in Antwerp's Jewish community. In 1940, Tempelsman and his family emigrated to the United States to escape persecution by Nazi Germany during World War II.  When he was 16, Tempelsman began working for his father, a diamond broker. He attended New York City's public schools and New York University.

Business interests 
In 1950, Tempelsman created a new marketing niche by persuading the US government to stockpile African diamonds for industrial and military purposes, with him as middleman. In 1957, at the age of 27, he and his lawyer, Adlai Stevenson, traveled to Africa, where Tempelsman had begun forging ties with leaders. His contacts eventually ranged from South African anti-apartheid politician Oliver Tambo to Zaire's kleptocratic dictator, Mobutu Sese Seko and the influential Oppenheimer diamond family. Tempelsman is chairman of the board of directors of Lazare Kaplan International Inc. (LKI), the largest diamond company in the United States, noted for its "ideal cut" diamonds sold worldwide under the brand name, Lazare Diamonds. Tempelsman is one of fewer than 90 "sightholders" in the world, which means that 10 times a year he is permitted to buy diamonds directly from the powerful De Beers cartel in the City of London. Because DeBeers was a virtual monopoly, for many years it could not operate legally in the United States.

 He is also a general partner of Leon Tempelsman & Son, an investment company specializing in real estate and venture capital.

Philanthropic and political activities 
Tempelsman maintains relations with political and business leaders, in particular government leaders in Africa and Russia, and leading figures in the U.S. Democratic Party.  His extensive political contacts and monetary contributions often provide him with access and prestige in those markets, as was the case during the presidency of Bill Clinton.  From 1993 to 1997, Tempelsman visited the White House at least ten times, met privately with Hillary Clinton on two occasions, vacationed with the Clintons and the Kennedy family in Martha's Vineyard, and flew to Moscow and back with President Clinton on Air Force One.

In Southern Africa, Tempelsman has played a key role in negotiations between hostile governments and companies engaging in diamond exploration. He met with Mobutu Sese Seko, to assist the regime's business dealings with De Beers. In the 1960s Tempelsman hired as his business agent the CIA station chief in Kinshasa, Larry Devlin, who helped put Mobutu in power and afterward served as his personal adviser. From March 3, 1977, Tempelsman briefly held the title of honorary consul general for Zaire, now known as the Democratic Republic of Congo (DRC), at the DRC's consular offices in New York City.  In addition to the DRC, Tempelsman has played a key role in the diamond industries of Angola, Botswana, Namibia, and Sierra Leone.

Tempelsman served as chairman of the Corporate Council on Africa (CCA) from 1999 to 2002 and again from 2007 to 2008, after which he was named chairman emeritus. An example of his work with the CCA involved assisting government leaders with establishing the New Partnership for Africa's Development. Tempelsman was a board member of the Southern African Enterprise Development Fund, and past chairman and long-serving board member of the Africa-America Institute.

Tempelsman is a trustee of the Eurasia Foundation, and a director of the National Democratic Institute for International Affairs, the Center for National Policy, the Business Council for International Understanding, and the U.S.-Russia Business Council.

He is chairman of the International Advisory Council of the Harvard School of Public Health's AIDS Initiative, and is an honorary trustee and an honorary member of the corporation of the Woods Hole Oceanographic Institution. Tempelsman is a member of the Council on Foreign Relations, and was named a visitor to the Department of Classical Art at the Museum of Fine Arts, Boston. A director of the Academy of American Poets, Tempelsman also serves as a trustee of the New York University Institute of Fine Arts, and on Lenox Hill Hospital's advisory board. He has served on several Presidential Commissions including the President's Commission for the Observance of Human Rights, the Citizen's advisory board of Youth Opportunities and the National Highway Safety Advisory Committee, and was appointed to the New York Council on International Business.

Looted Morgantina acroliths
In 1980, Tempelsman bought, for $1 million, two 500 BC acroliths representing Demeter and Persephone; the pieces consisted of two marble heads, three feet, and three hands. Tempelsman purchased them from the later-infamous art dealer Robin Symes. The Italian government first claimed the items when they were displayed in a 1988 exhibition at the J. Paul Getty Museum in Malibu; the museum had listed them as belonging to a private collector. The Italian authorities determined that they were looted from Morgantina, and smuggled into Switzerland, where they were acquired by Symes. They were finally repatriated to the archeological museum of Aidone in 2007, after being on exhibit for five years at the Fralin Museum of Art, part of the University of Virginia in Charlottesville. Putatively, in 2005, Tempelsman donated the pieces to the university museum, and the restitution to Italy was mediated by the university's archeology professor Malcolm Bell III.

Personal life

Marriage and children
Tempelsman has grown children by his wife Lilly Bucholz, who had also fled Antwerp with her family. They were married in 1949. Their daughter, Rena, is the widow of Robert Speisman, an executive vice president of Lazare Kaplan International Inc. who died on board American Airlines Flight 77, when the aircraft crashed into The Pentagon during the September 11 attacks.

Tempelsman and Bucholz formally separated in 1984. According to People, Bucholz and Tempelsman never legally divorced.

Relationship with Jacqueline Onassis 
Tempelsman was the longtime companion of Jacqueline Kennedy Onassis.  Maurice and Lilly Tempelsman were guests at the State Dinner given at Mount Vernon, Virginia in honor of the President Ayub Khan of Pakistan in 1961. The two began their lengthy relationship in 1980, five years after the death of Jacqueline Onassis' second husband Aristotle Onassis.  In 1988, Tempelsman moved into Onassis's Fifth Avenue penthouse apartment in New York City.  During their relationship, he handled Onassis's finances, quadrupling the $26 million that was secured from her late husband's estate. The couple frequently took walks through Central Park and were photographed doing so in the days preceding her death from Non-Hodgkin lymphoma at age 64 on May 19, 1994.  At Onassis's funeral service, Tempelsman read Constantine P. Cavafy's poem Ithaca, one of her favorites, and concluded by saying: "And now the journey is over, too short, alas, too short. It was filled with adventure and wisdom, laughter and love, gallantry and grace.  So farewell, farewell." Tempelsman was one of two executors of the will that she had drawn up with her long-time attorney, Alexander D. Forger. She left him a "Greek alabaster head of a woman" and named Tempelsman to be a co‑chair of a charitable organization, the C & J Foundation. However, there was no residuary left to fund the foundation after estate taxes were paid.

See also 

 List of Belgian Americans
 List of New York University alumni
 List of people from Antwerp
 List of people from New York City

References

External links
 Lazare Kaplan International Inc.

1929 births
20th-century American businesspeople
20th-century Belgian Jews
21st-century American businesspeople
21st-century Belgian Jews
American people of Belgian-Jewish descent
American Orthodox Jews
Philanthropists from New York (state)
American socialites
Belgian Ashkenazi Jews
Belgian emigrants to the United States
Belgian Orthodox Jews
Businesspeople from New York City
Diamond dealers
Living people
New York (state) Democrats
New York University alumni
Jewish emigrants from Nazi Germany to the United States
People from the Upper East Side
Jews who emigrated to escape Nazism
Presidency of Bill Clinton
Harvard School of Public Health people